Limón is a corregimiento in Colón District, Colón Province, Panama with a population of 4,665 as of 2010. Its population as of 1990 was 3,209; its population as of 2000 was 4,092.

References

Corregimientos of Colón Province